Jack O'Malley is an American politician. O'Malley was a Republican member of the Michigan House of Representatives from District 101 from 2019 to 2022.

Education 
O'Malley graduated from Specs Howard School of Broadcast Media.

Career 
O'Malley was a radio and television broadcaster for roughly 40 years. O'Malley hosted the WTCM FM morning show in 1984.

On November 6, 2018, O'Malley won the election and became a Republican member of the Michigan House of Representatives for District 101. O'Malley defeated Kathy Wiejaczka with 58% of the votes.

Personal life 
O'Malley's wife is Robin. She has a child from her first marriage. O’Malley has two adult children from his first marriage.

See also 
 2018 Michigan House of Representatives election

References

External links 
 Jack O'Malley at gophouse.com
 Jack O'Malley at ballotpedia.org
 Jack O'Malley at countrylines.com

Living people
Radio personalities from Michigan
Republican Party members of the Michigan House of Representatives
21st-century American politicians
Year of birth missing (living people)